The Regional Episcopal Conference of North Africa (CERNA) (French: Conférence Episcopale Régionale du Nord de l'Afrique or Conférence des Evêques de la Région Nord de l’Afrique) is the episcopal conference of the Catholic Church in Algeria, Libya, Morocco, Tunisia, and Western Sahara. Founded in 1965, it is composed of all active and retired members of the Catholic hierarchy (i.e., diocesan, coadjutor, and auxiliary bishops) in those countries. The conference is based in Rabat, the capital of Morocco. The current President is Paul Desfarges, the Archbishop of Algiers.

History 
The Regional Episcopal Conference of North Africa was founded in 1966, with Archbishop of Algiers Cardinal Léon-Étienne Duval as its first president.

On 8 June 2007, a members of the conference were received by Pope Benedict XVI in Vatican City. The five bishops present were Maroun Elias Nimeh Lahham, Claude Rault, Gabriel Piroird, Giovanni Innocenzo Martinelli, and Alphonse Georger.

From October 6–9, 2013, the Regional Episcopal Conference of North Africa met in Rome. The bishops resided at the Pontifical French Seminary and met there to discuss issues facing the bishops' respective countries and dioceses. The trip ended on October 9, when the bishops went to St. Peter's Square to hear Pope Francis' public address. Francis personally addressed the bishops from North Africa, calling for them to "consolidate our fraternal relations with Muslims."

Member dioceses

Presidents 
This is a list of the Presidents of the Regional Episcopal Conference of North Africa:

See also 
 Catholic Church in the Middle East
 Catholic Church in Algeria
 Catholic Church in Libya
 Catholic Church in Morocco
 Catholic Church in Tunisia
 Catholic Church in Western Sahara

References 

1966 in Christianity
Africa North
Catholic Church in Algeria
Catholic Church in Libya
Catholic Church in Morocco
Catholic Church in Tunisia
Catholic Church in Western Sahara
Organizations based in Rabat
International Christian organizations
Christian organizations established in 1966
Catholic organizations established in the 20th century
Christianity in the Arab world
Christianity in North Africa
1966 establishments in Africa